William John Malarkey (November 26, 1878 – December 12, 1956) was a pitcher in Major League Baseball.

Malarkey's only season in the majors was 1908, when he pitched 35 innings for the New York Giants. He played in the minor leagues until 1915, winning a career-high 25 games in 1913.

References

1878 births
1956 deaths
Baseball players from Illinois
Major League Baseball pitchers
New York Giants (NL) players
Sharon Giants players
Buffalo Bisons (minor league) players
Oakland Oaks (baseball) players
Minor league baseball managers
People from Rock Island County, Illinois